Robert Merz (25 November 1887 – 30 August 1914) was an Austrian amateur football (soccer) player. He died during World War I, aged 26.

Club career
Born in Zizkow, Merz began playing youth football with a predecessor to Wiener Sport-Club (Wiener SV). He joined Wiener SV's senior side at age 16, before becoming a professional with DFC Prag when he moved back to his hometown in 1907.

International career
He was a member of the Austrian Olympic squad at the 1912 Summer Olympics and played two matches in the main tournament as well as two matches in the consolation tournament. He scored two goals against Germany in the first round of the main tournament.

For the Austria national football team he played 13 games and scored 5 goals.

Military service
Merz was a reserve lieutenant in the Austro-Hungarian Army during World War I.

See also
 List of Olympians killed in World War I

References

External links 
 

1887 births
1914 deaths
Austrian footballers
Austria international footballers
Olympic footballers of Austria
Footballers at the 1912 Summer Olympics
Austro-Hungarian military personnel killed in World War I
Association football forwards
DFC Prag players
Footballers from Vienna